Coccolepis is an extinct genus of prehistoric ray-finned fish in the family Coccolepididae. Originally including most species within the family, it is now restricted to two species from the Late Jurassic Solnhofen Limestone of Germany. The holotype of C. bucklandi, designated and described by Louis Agassiz, was thought to be lost but was later rediscovered in Neuchâtel.

Some species originally referred to Coccolepis were later reallocated to other genera:
Coccolepis groeberi Bordas, 1943 → Condorlepis groeberi (Bordas, 1943)
Coccolepis andrewsi Woodward, 1891 → Morrolepis andrewsi (Woodward, 1891)
Coccolepis aniscowitchi Gorizdor-Kulczycka, 1926 → Morrolepis aniscowitchi (Gorizdor-Kulczycka, 1926)
Coccolepis macroptera Traquair, 1911 → Barbalepis macroptera (Traquair, 1911)

See also

 Prehistoric fish
 List of prehistoric bony fish

References

Prehistoric chondrostei
Jurassic bony fish
Prehistoric fish of Australia

Prehistoric ray-finned fish genera